Sep. 2 - Eastern Orthodox liturgical calendar - Sep. 4

All fixed commemorations below celebrated on September 16 by Orthodox Churches on the Old Calendar.

For September 3rd, Orthodox Churches on the Old Calendar commemorate the Saints listed on August 21.

Saints
 Saint Phoebe, Deaconess of Cenchreae near Corinth (1st century)
 Hieromartyr Aristion of Alexandria (Kelladion), Bishop of Alexandria Scabiosa (modern Iskenderun) (c. 167)
 Hieromartyr Anthimus of Nicomedia, Bishop of Nicomedia (302)
 Hieromartyr Theophilus the Deacon, and martyrs Dorotheus, Mardonius, Migdonius, Peter, Indes, Gorgonius, Zeno, Virgin Domna, and Euthymius (302)
 Martyr Basilissa of Nicomedia (309)
 Martyr Zenon, immersed in a cauldron of boiling lead.
 Martyr Chariton, thrown into a pit of boiling lime.
 Martyr Archontius.
 Venerable Theoctistus of Palestine, fellow ascetic with Venerable Euthymius the Great (451)
 Saint Constantine the New (Heraclius Constantine), Emperor of Byzantium, in the Church of the Holy Apostles (641)
 Saint Trivelius Theoktist (Khan Tervel of Bulgaria), who played an important role in defeating the Arabs during the Siege of Constantinople in 717–718 (721)

Pre-Schism Western saints
 Saints Euphemia, Dorothy, Thecla and Erasma, a group of virgin-martyrs in Aquileia in Italy, venerated in Venice and Ravenna (1st century)
 Saint Mansuetus (Mansuy), Bishop of Toul in France, Confessor (c. 350)
 Saint Ambrose, Bishop of Sens in France (c. 455)
 Saint Macanisius (Mac Nisse of Connor), the founder and first bishop-abbot of Connor (514)
 Saint Auxanus (Sant'Ansano), Bishop of Milan (568) 
 Saint Maurilius, Bishop of Cahors in France (580)
 Saint Natalis, a priest in Casale in Piedmont (6th century)
 Saint Gregory the Great (the Dialogist), Pope of Rome (604)  (see also: March 12)
 Saint Remaclus, Bishop of Maastricht (c. 663)
 Saint Frugentius, a monk at Fleury Abbey, martyred with St Aigulphus, Abbot of Lérins in France (675) 
 Saint Aigulphus of Provence (Ayou, Ayoul), Abbot of Lérins (c. 676)
 Saint Hereswith, a princess from Northumbria in England, and sister of St Hilda, she ended her life as a nun at Chelles Abbey in France (c. 690)
 Saint Regulus (Reol), a monk at Rebais in France with St Philibert, later Archbishop of Rheims and founder of the monastery of Orbais (698)
 Saint Sandalus (Sandila, Sandolus, Sandulf), a martyr in Cordoba in Spain under the Moors (c. 855)
 Saint Edward the Martyr, Martyr and King of England (978)  (see also: March 18 and February 13 - translation of relics)

Post-Schism Orthodox saints
 Saint Ioannicius II, First Serbian Patriarch, Wonderworker (1354)
 Blessed John "the Hairy", Fool-for-Christ of Rostov (1580)
 New Martyr Polydorus of Leucosia, Cyprus, at New Ephesus (1794)

New martyrs and confessors
 New Hieromartyr Pimen (Belolikov), Bishop of Vernensk and Semirechensk (1918)
 New Hieromartyr Meletius (Golokolosv), Hieromonk of the Issyk-Kul Holy Trinity Monastery, Kyrgyzstan (1918)
 New Hieromartyrs Sergius Fenomenov, Basil Kolmikov, Philip Shatsky, and Vladimir Dmitrievsky, Priests (1918)
 New Hieromartyrs Basil Krasivsky and Parthenius Krasivsky, Priests (1919)
 New Hieromartyrs Andrew Dalnikov and Theophan Sokolov, Priests (1920)
 New Hieromartyrs Vladimir Sadovsky and Michael Sushkov, Priests (1921)
 New Hieromartyr Nicholas Sushchevsky, Priest (1923)
 New Hieromartyr Euthymius Krygovich, Priest, and 4 martyrs with him (1924)
 New Hieromartyr Romanus Marchenko, Priest (1929)
 New Hieromartyr Alexis Zinoviev, Priest (1937)
 New Hieromartyr Elias Bazhanov, Priest (1937)
 New Hieromartyr Peter Sorokin, Deacon of Alma-Ata (1953)

Other commemorations
 Icon of the Theotokos of Pisidian Sozopolis (608)
 Repose of Priest Peter of Uglich, Fool-for-Christ (1866)
 Translation of the relics (1953) of St. Nektarios (Kephalas) of Aegina, Metropolitan of Pentapolis and Wonderworker (1920)
 Translation of the relics of Venerable Anthimos (Vagianos) of Chios (1960)

Icon gallery

Notes

References

Sources
 September 3/September 16. Orthodox Calendar (PRAVOSLAVIE.RU).
 September 16 / September 3. HOLY TRINITY RUSSIAN ORTHODOX CHURCH (A parish of the Patriarchate of Moscow).
 September 3. OCA - The Lives of the Saints.
 The Autonomous Orthodox Metropolia of Western Europe and the Americas (ROCOR). St. Hilarion Calendar of Saints for the year of our Lord 2004. St. Hilarion Press (Austin, TX). p. 65.
 The Third Day of the Month of September. Orthodoxy in China.
 September 3. Latin Saints of the Orthodox Patriarchate of Rome.
 The Roman Martyrology. Transl. by the Archbishop of Baltimore. Last Edition, According to the Copy Printed at Rome in 1914. Revised Edition, with the Imprimatur of His Eminence Cardinal Gibbons. Baltimore: John Murphy Company, 1916. pp. 269–270.
 Rev. Richard Stanton. A Menology of England and Wales, or, Brief Memorials of the Ancient British and English Saints Arranged According to the Calendar, Together with the Martyrs of the 16th and 17th Centuries. London: Burns & Oates, 1892. pp. 434–435.

 Greek Sources
 Great Synaxaristes:  3 ΣΕΠΤΕΜΒΡΙΟΥ. ΜΕΓΑΣ ΣΥΝΑΞΑΡΙΣΤΗΣ.
  Συναξαριστής. 3 Σεπτεμβρίου. ECCLESIA.GR. (H ΕΚΚΛΗΣΙΑ ΤΗΣ ΕΛΛΑΔΟΣ).
  03/09/. Ορθόδοξος Συναξαριστής.

 Russian Sources
  16 сентября (3 сентября). Православная Энциклопедия под редакцией Патриарха Московского и всея Руси Кирилла (электронная версия). (Orthodox Encyclopedia - Pravenc.ru).
  3 сентября по старому стилю / 16 сентября по новому стилю. Русская Православная Церковь - Православный церковный календарь на  год.

September in the Eastern Orthodox calendar